Ferdinand Maximilien Mériadec de Rohan (1738–1813) was an Archbishop of Bordeaux starting in 1769, and Prince-Archbishop of Cambrai from 1781. He was the son of Hercule Meriadec de Rohan, prince de Guéméné and Louise-Gabrielle Julie de Rohan; brother of cardinal de Rohan, and Jules, prince de Guéméné.

Mériadec was a chaplain of the Empress Joséphine de Beauharnais. He served as prior and doctor of the Sorbonne and provost of the church of Strasbourg.

He was nominated Archbishop of Bordeaux by King Louis XV on 26 December 1769, and his bulls were granted by Pope Clement XIV in the Consistory of 29 January 1770.  He was consecrated a bishop in the church of the Sorbonne on 8 April 1770 by his brother Louis, the coadjutor Archbishop of Strasbourg, assisted by the Bishops of Poitiers and Vabres.  He was installed in Bordeaux by procurator. He made his solemn entry into Bordeaux on 5 May 1771. He was nominated Archbishop of Cambrai by King Louis XVI on 28 January 1781, and received his bulls from Pope Pius VI dated 2 April 1781.  He died in Paris in 1813.
His mistress was Charlotte Stuart, Duchess of Albany, illegitimate daughter of Prince Charles Edward Stuart, with whom he had three children, including Charles Edward Stuart, Count Roehenstart. Lacking legitimacy or permission, Charlotte was unable to marry. Thus, she otherwise sought a protector and provider. Probably unbeknownst to her father, Prince Charles Edward Stuart ("Bonnie Prince Charlie"), she became the mistress of Mériadec – related by blood to the house of Stuart as well as Bourbon and Lorraine – who was also unable to marry legitimately, having entered the Church as a younger son of a noble house. By him, she had three children: two daughters, Marie Victoire and Charlotte, and finally a son, Charles Edward. Her children were kept secret, and remained largely unknown until the 20th century. When Charlotte eventually left France for Florence shortly after her son's birth, she entrusted the children into the care of her mother, Clementina Walkinshaw, and it appears that few, and certainly not her father, knew of their existence.

His sister-in-law, Marie Louise de La Tour d'Auvergne, was a first cousin of Prince Charles Edward Stuart and became his mistress. They had a son together, Charles Godefroi Sophie Jules Marie de Rohan, but Charles left her for Clementina Walkinshaw, with whom he had Charlotte.

Ancestry

References

Sources

thePeerage.com (accessed 4 February 2007)

Archbishops of Bordeaux
Academic staff of the University of Paris
18th-century Roman Catholic archbishops in France
19th-century Roman Catholic archbishops in France
Archbishops of Cambrai
1738 births
1813 deaths
Ferdinand Maximilien Meriadec de Rohan